Denis O'Beirne Faul (14 August 1932 – 21 June 2006), was an Irish Roman Catholic priest and civil rights campaigner best known for his role in the 1981 Irish Hunger Strike. At his death, he held the honorific title of Monsignor within the Catholic Church.

Biography
Born on 14 August 1932 in the village of Louth, County Louth, in the north of the Province of Leinster, he was the son of Joseph and Anne Frances Faul. He was educated at St Patrick's College, Armagh, and thereafter studied for the priesthood at St Patrick's College, Maynooth, where he was ordained in 1956. After a year studying Theology in Rome, he joined the staff of St Patrick's Boys' Academy in Dungannon, Co Tyrone, to teach Latin and religion. He was appointed principal in 1983.

Civil rights movement
Faul (known as Father Faul at the time) became actively involved in the Northern Ireland civil rights movement in 1968, participating in marches. He protested vigorously against civil rights abuses by the elements of the British security forces. However he also condemned the killings perpetrated by the Provisional Irish Republican Army.

He also campaigned for the release of the Birmingham Six and the Guildford Four and Maguire Seven before their causes became well-known and vindicated.

Irish hunger strike
In 1981, as a visiting priest assisting the formally appointed chaplain, Faul played a decisive role in ending the hunger strike. In July 1981, he tried to persuade families of the hunger strikers that the campaign would not change the minds of Margaret Thatcher and her ministers and nothing could be gained by more deaths. The families spoke to the prisoners, resulting in two prisoners (Paddy Quinn and Pat McKeown) being moved to the hospital wings where they could be fed. By 6 September, four other participants had joined them and the remaining prisoners agreed to end their campaign on 3 October. The IRA referred to him as Dennis the Menace at this time.

In 1993 he described his role in the hunger strikes for a BBC "Timewatch" documentary.

Later life
Faul was honoured by the church with the title Monsignor in 1995. Following his retirement from teaching in 1998 he became Parish Priest of neighbouring Termonmaguirc (Carrickmore). Faul died of cancer in Dublin on 21 June 2006, aged 73. Former hunger strikers and prisoners, Republicans and senior members of Sinn Féin attended the large funeral at St. Colmcille's Church, Carrickmore, many having come to respect the work carried out by Faul over his lifetime.

He criticised integrated education, insisting that Catholic parents were required by Canon law to send their children to Catholic schools and also claimed the schools were a "dirty political trick" inspired by the British Government.

Publications
 The RUC: The Black and Blue Book by Fr. Denis Faul and Fr. Raymond Murray (1975) 
 H Blocks: British Jail for Irish Political Prisoners by Denis Faul and Raymond Murray (1979)
 The British Dimension: Brutality, Murder and Legal Duplicity in N. Ireland by Denis Faul and Raymond Murray (1980)
 Plastic Bullets - Plastic Government: Deaths and Injuries by Plastic Bullets, August 1981-October 1982  by Denis Faul and Raymond Murray (1982)
 The Hooded Men: British Torture in Ireland, August, October 1971 by Denis Faul and Raymond Murray, Wordwell (2017)

References

1932 births
2006 deaths
People of The Troubles (Northern Ireland)
People from County Louth
Alumni of St Patrick's College, Maynooth
20th-century Irish Roman Catholic priests
Deaths from cancer in the Republic of Ireland